Reginald Pole (12 March 1500 – 17 November 1558) was an English cardinal of the Catholic Church and the last Catholic archbishop of Canterbury, holding the office from 1556 to 1558, during the Counter-Reformation.

Early life 
Pole was born at Stourton Castle, Staffordshire, on 12 March 1500, the third son of Sir Richard Pole and Margaret Pole, 8th Countess of Salisbury. He was named after the now Blessed Reginald of Orleans, O.P. His maternal grandparents were George Plantagenet, 1st Duke of Clarence, and Isabella Neville, Duchess of Clarence; thus he was a great-nephew of kings Edward IV and Richard III and a great-grandson of Richard Neville, 16th Earl of Warwick.

Pole received his early education at Sheen Priory. He matriculated at Magdalen College, Oxford, in 1512, and at Oxford was taught by William Latimer and Thomas Linacre, graduating with a BA degree on 27 June 1515. In February 1518, King Henry VIII granted him the deanery of Wimborne Minster, Dorset; after which he was Prebendary of Salisbury and Dean of Exeter in 1527. He was also a canon in York, and had several other livings, although he had not been ordained a priest. Assisted by Bishop Edward Foxe, he represented Henry VIII in Paris in 1529, researching general opinions among theologians of the Sorbonne about the annulment of Henry's marriage with Catherine of Aragon.

In 1521, Pole went to the University of Padua, where he met leading Renaissance figures, including Pietro Bembo, Gianmatteo Giberti (formerly Pope Leo X's datary and chief minister), Jacopo Sadoleto, Gianpietro Carafa (the future Pope Paul IV), Rodolfo Pio, Otto Truchsess, Stanislaus Hosius, Cristoforo Madruzzo, Giovanni Morone, Pier Paolo Vergerio the younger, Peter Martyr Vermigli and Vettor Soranzo. The last three were eventually condemned as heretics by the Catholic Church, with Vermigli—as a well-known Protestant theologian—having a significant share in the Reformation in Pole's native England.

Pole's studies in Padua were partly financed by his election as a fellow of Corpus Christi College, Oxford, with more than half of the cost paid by Henry VIII himself on 14 February 1523, which allowed him to study abroad for three years.

Pole and Henry VIII 
Pole returned home in July 1526, when he came from France, escorted by Thomas Lupset. Henry VIII offered him the Archbishopric of York or the Diocese of Winchester if he would support the annulment of his marriage to Catherine of Aragon. Pole withheld his support and went into self-imposed exile in France and Italy in 1532, where he continued his studies in Padua and Paris. After his return, he held the benefice of vicar of Piddletown, Dorset, between 20 December 1532 and about January 1535/1536.

In May 1536, Reginald Pole finally and decisively broke with the King. In 1531, he had warned of the dangers of the Boleyn marriage; he had returned to Padua in 1532 and received a last English benefice in December. Eustace Chapuys, the imperial ambassador to England, had suggested to Emperor Charles V that Pole marry Henry's daughter Mary and combine their dynastic claims; Chapuys also communicated with Reginald through his brother Geoffrey. At this time Pole was not definitively in Holy Orders.

The final break between Pole and Henry followed upon Thomas Cromwell, Cuthbert Tunstall, Thomas Starkey and others addressing questions to Pole on behalf of Henry. He answered by sending the king a copy of his published treatise Pro ecclesiasticae unitatis defensione, which, besides being a theological reply to the questions, was a strong denunciation of the king's policies that denied Henry's position on the marriage of his brother Arthur's widow and denied the royal supremacy; Pole also urged the princes of Europe to depose Henry immediately. Henry wrote to Pole's mother, the Countess of Salisbury, who in turn sent her son a letter reproving him for his "folly".

Cardinal Pole 

On 22 December 1536, Pole, already a deacon, was created a cardinal over Pole's own objections. He also became papal legate to England in February 1536/1537.  Pope Paul III put him in charge of organising assistance for the Pilgrimage of Grace (and related movements), an effort to organise a march on London to demand Henry replace his ‘reformist’ advisers with more traditional, Catholic minds; neither Francis I of France nor the Emperor supported this effort, and the English government tried to have Pole assassinated. In 1539, Pole was sent to the Emperor to organise an embargo against England – the sort of countermeasure he had himself warned Henry was possible.

The king, with Pole himself out of his reach, took revenge on Pole's family for engaging in treason by word against the king. This later became known as the Exeter Conspiracy. The leading members were arrested, and all their properties seized. The action destroyed the Pole family.  Sir Geoffrey Pole was arrested in August 1538; he had been corresponding with Reginald, and the investigation of Henry Courtenay, Marquess of Exeter (Henry VIII's first cousin and the Countess of Salisbury's second cousin) had turned up his name; he had appealed to Thomas Cromwell, who had him arrested and interrogated. Under interrogation, Sir Geoffrey said that Henry Pole, 1st Baron Montagu, and Exeter had all been parties to his correspondence with Reginald. Montagu, Exeter, and Lady Salisbury were arrested in November 1538, together with Henry Pole and other family members, on charges of treason, although Cromwell had previously written that they had "little offended save that he [Reginald Pole] is of their kin". They were committed to the Tower of London and, with the exception of Geoffrey Pole, they were all eventually executed.

In January 1539, Sir Geoffrey was pardoned, and Montagu and Exeter were tried and executed for treason, while Reginald Pole was attainted in absentia. In May 1539, Montagu, Exeter, Lady Salisbury, and others were also attainted, as her father had been; this meant that they lost their lands – mostly in the South of England, conveniently located to assist any invasion according to the crown – and titles and those still alive in the Tower were also sentenced to death, so could be executed at the King's will. As part of the evidence given in support of the Bill of Attainder, Cromwell produced a tunic bearing the Five Wounds of Christ, symbolising Lady Salisbury's support of traditional Catholicism; the supposed discovery, six months after her house and effects had been searched when she was arrested, is likely to be a fabrication.

Margaret Pole was held in the Tower of London for two and a half years under severe conditions; she, her grandson (Montagu's son), and Exeter's son were held together and supported by the King. In 1540, Cromwell himself fell from favour and was himself executed and attainted. She was finally executed in 1541, protesting her innocence until the last – a highly publicised case which was considered a grave miscarriage of justice both at the time and later. Pole is known to have said that he would "never fear to call himself the son of a martyr". Some 350 years later, in 1886, Margaret was beatified by Pope Leo XIII. Aside from the aforementioned oppositional treatise, King Henry's harshness towards the Pole family might have derived from the fact that Pole's mother, Margaret, was one of the last surviving members of the House of Plantagenet. Under some circumstances, that descent could have made Reginald – until he definitely entered the clergy – a possible contender for the throne itself.

In 1542 he was appointed as one of the three papal legates to preside over the Council of Trent, in 1549 he was appointed by Pope Paul III abbot of Gavello or Canalnuovo, and after the death of Pope Paul III in 1549 Pole, at one point, had 26 out of the 28 votes he needed to become pope himself at the papal conclave of 1549–50. His personal belief in justification by faith over works had caused him problems at Trent and accusations of heresy at the conclave. Thomas Hoby, visiting Rome to be present during the conclave, recorded that Pole failed to be elected "by the Cardinall of Ferrara his meanes the voice of manie cardinalls of the French partie, persuading them that Cardinall Pole was both Imperiall and also a verie Lutheran".

Later years 

The death of Edward VI on 6 July 1553 and the accession of Mary I to the throne of England hastened Pole's return from exile, as a papal legate to England (which he served as until 1557). In 1554, Cardinal Pole came to England to receive the kingdom back into the Catholic fold. However, Queen Mary I and Emperor Charles V delayed him until 20 November 1554, due to apprehension that Pole might oppose Mary's forthcoming marriage to Charles's son, Philip of Spain.

As Papal Legate, Pole negotiated a papal dispensation allowing the new owners of confiscated former monastic lands to retain them, and in return Parliament enabled the Revival of the Heresy Acts in January 1555. This revived former measures against heresy: the letters patent of 1382 of Richard II, an Act of 1401 of Henry IV, and an Act of 1414 of Henry V. All of these had been repealed under Henry VIII and Edward VI. On 13 November 1555, Thomas Cranmer was officially deprived of the See of Canterbury. The Pope appointed Pole a cardinal-priest and administrator of the See of Canterbury on 11 December 1555.

Under Mary's rule, Pole, whose attainder was reversed in 1554, was finally ordained as a priest on 20 March 1556 and consecrated as archbishop of Canterbury two days later, an office he would hold until his death. He was also chancellor of both Oxford and Cambridge universities in 1555 and 1555/1556 respectively. As well as his religious duties, he was in effect the Queen's chief minister and adviser.  Many former enemies, including Cranmer, signed recantations affirming their religious belief in transubstantiation and papal supremacy. Despite this, which should have absolved them under Mary's own Revival of the Heresy Acts, the Queen could not forget their responsibility for the annulment of her mother's marriage.

In 1555, Queen Mary began permitting the burning of Protestants for heresy, and some 220 men and 60 women were executed before her death in 1558. These persecutions contributed to the ultimate victory of the English Reformation, though Pole's involvement in these heresy trials is disputed. Pole was in failing health during the worst period of persecution, and there is some evidence that he favoured a more lenient approach: "Three condemned heretics from Bonner's diocese were pardoned on an appeal to him; he merely enjoined a penance and gave them absolution." As the reign wore on, an increasing number of people turned against Mary and her government, and some people who had been indifferent to the English Reformation began turning against Catholicism. Writings such as John Foxe's 1568 Book of Martyrs, which emphasised the sufferings of the reformers under Mary, helped shape popular opinion against Catholicism in England for generations.

Despite being a lifelong devout Catholic, Pole had a dispute with Pope Paul IV. Elected in 1555, Paul IV had a distaste for Catholic humanism and men like Pole who pushed a softer version of Catholicism to win over Protestants, as well as being fiercely anti-Spanish and against Mary's marriage to Philip II of Spain and heavily against Pole's support for it. Because of this disagreement Paul first cancelled Pole's legatine authority, and then sought to recall Pole to Rome to face investigation for heresy in his early writings. Mary refused to send Pole to Rome, yet accepted his suspension from office.

Pole died in London, during an influenza epidemic, on 17 November 1558, at about 7:00 pm, nearly 12 hours after Queen Mary's death. He was buried on the north side of the Corona at Canterbury Cathedral.

Author 
Pole was the author of De Concilio and of treatises on the authority of the pope and the Anglican Reformation of England, and of many important letters, full of interest for the history of the time, edited by Angelo Maria Quirini.

He is known for his strong condemnation of Machiavelli's book The Prince, which he read in Italy, and on which he commented: "I found this type of book to be written by an enemy of the human race. It explains every means whereby religion, justice and any inclination toward virtue could be destroyed".

In popular culture 
Cardinal Pole is a major character in the historical novels The Time Before You Die by Lucy Beckett, The Courier's Tale by Peter Walker and The Trusted Servant by Alison Macleod, and features in Hilary Mantel's novel The Mirror and the Light, the third and last of her novels on the life of Thomas Cromwell.

In Season 3 of Showtime's series The Tudors, Cardinal Pole is portrayed by Canadian actor Mark Hildreth. In the mini-series The Virgin Queen he is played by Michael Feast; he is last seen leading Mary's servants out of Greenwich Palace as Elizabeth I arrives as queen.

Reginald Pole is a major character in Queen of Martyrs: The Story of Mary I by Samantha Wilcoxson.

Reginald Pole, along with his brothers, sister, and mother, are the central family in Phillipa Gregory's historical novel The King's Curse.

See also 
Nicodemite

References

Sources 
 Phillips, T. (1764). History of the Life of Reginald Pole (two volumes, Oxford, 1764), the earliest English.
 Stewart, A. M. (1882). Life of Cardinal Pole (London, 1882)
 Lee, F. G. (1888). Reginald Pole, Cardinal Archbishop of Canterbury: An Historical Sketch (London, 1888)
 Zimmermann, Athanasius (1893). Kardinal Pole: sein Leben und seine Schriften (Regensberg, 1893)
 Gairdner, James (1903). The English Church in the Sixteenth Century (London, 1903)
  [pseudonym of Marie Hallé]
 
 Fenlon, Dermot (2008). Heresy and Obedience in Tridentine Italy: Cardinal Pole and the Counter Reformation, Cambridge University Press, 2008.
 
 Tellechea Idigoras, Jose Ignacio (1977). Fray Bartolome Carranza Y El Cardenal Pole: Un Navarro En La Restauracion Catolica De Inglaterra (1554–1558) Diputacion Foral de Navarra, Institucion Principe de Viana, Consejo Superior de Investigaciones Cientificas. 1977. .

Attribution

External links 

 "The role of the Venetian Oligarchy" by Webster Tarpley (includes detailed discussion of Pole's activities in Italy)
 "Queen Mary" by Alfred Tennyson, "Enter Cardinal Pole"
 Henry Cole, Cardinal Pole's Vicar General, tries to restore Catholicism at Cambridge University
 
 T. F. Mayer, 'Pole, Reginald (1500–1558)', Oxford Dictionary of National Biography, Oxford University Press, 2004; online edn, Jan 2008, Reginald Pole.

1500 births
1558 deaths
Alumni of Magdalen College, Oxford
Archbishops of Canterbury
Chancellors of the University of Cambridge
Counter-Reformation
Deans of Exeter
Diplomats of the Holy See
16th-century English cardinals
English religious writers
Fellows of Corpus Christi College, Oxford
History of Catholicism in England
Participants in the Council of Trent
Spirituali
Younger sons of earls
Burials at Canterbury Cathedral